Kinshasa, formerly Léopoldville, is the capital and largest city of the Democratic Republic of the Congo. Once a site of fishing and trading villages situated along the Congo River, Kinshasa is now one of the world's fastest growing megacities. 

The city of Kinshasa is also one of the DRC's 26 provinces. Because the administrative boundaries of the city-province cover a vast area, over 90 percent of the city-province's land is rural in nature, and the urban area occupies a small but expanding section on the western side.

Kinshasa is Africa's third-largest metropolitan area after Cairo and Lagos. It is also the world's largest nominally Francophone urban area, with French being the language of government, education, media, public services and high-end commerce in the city, while Lingala is used as a lingua franca in the street. Kinshasa hosted the 14th Francophonie Summit in October 2012.

Residents of Kinshasa are known as Kinois (in French and sometimes in English) or Kinshasans (English).
The city faces Brazzaville, the capital of the neighbouring Republic of the Congo. Although the river span is 7 km wide at this point, the two cities are the world's second-closest pair of capital cities (after Vatican City and Rome).

History

The city was established as a trading post by Henry Morton Stanley in 1881. It was named Léopoldville in honour of King Leopold II of the Belgians, who controlled the Congo Free State, the vast territory that is now the Democratic Republic of the Congo, not as a colony but as a private property. The completion of the Matadi-Kinshasa portage railway, in 1898, provided an alternative route around the rapids and sparked the rapid development of Léopoldville. In 1914, a pipeline was installed so that crude oil could be transported from Matadi to the upriver steamers in Leopoldville. By 1923, the city was elevated to capital of the Belgian Congo, replacing the town of Boma in the Congo estuary. The town, nicknamed "Léo" or "Leopold", became a commercial centre and grew rapidly during the colonial period.

After gaining its independence on 30 June 1960, following riots in 1959, the Republic of the Congo elected its first prime minister, Patrice Lumumba. Lumumba's perceived pro-Soviet leanings were viewed as a threat by Western interests. This being the height of the Cold War, the U.S. and Belgium did not want to lose control of the strategic wealth of the Congo, in particular its uranium. Less than a year after Lumumba's election, the Belgians and the U.S. bought the support of his Congolese rivals and set in motion the events that culminated in Lumumba's assassination. In 1964, Moïse Tshombe decreed the expulsion of all nationals of Republic of the Congo, Burundi and Mali, as well as all political refugees from Rwanda. In 1965, with the help of the U.S. and Belgium, Joseph-Désiré Mobutu seized power in the Congo. He initiated a policy of "Authenticity," attempting to renativize the names of people and places in the country. In 1966, Léopoldville was renamed Kinshasa, for a village named Kinshasa that once stood near the site, today Kinshasa (commune). The city grew rapidly under Mobutu, drawing people from across the country who came in search of their fortunes or to escape ethnic strife elsewhere, thus adding to the many ethnicities and languages already found there.

In 1991 the city had to fend off rioting soldiers, who were protesting the government's failure to pay them. Subsequently a rebel uprising began, which by 1997 had brought down the regime of Mobutu. Kinshasa suffered greatly from Mobutu's excesses, mass corruption, nepotism and the civil war that led to his downfall. Nevertheless, it is still a major cultural and intellectual center for Central Africa, with a flourishing community of musicians and artists. It is also the country's major industrial centre, processing many of the natural products brought from the interior.

Joseph Kabila, president of the Democratic Republic of the Congo from 2001 to 2019, was not overly popular in Kinshasa. Violence broke out following the announcement of Kabila's victory in the contested election of 2006; the European Union deployed troops (EUFOR RD Congo) to join the UN force in the city. The announcement in 2016 that a new election would be delayed two years led to large protests in September and December which involved barricades in the streets and left dozens of people dead. Schools and businesses were closed down.

Geography

Kinshasa is a city of sharp contrasts, with affluent residential and commercial areas and three universities alongside sprawling slums. It is located along the south bank of the Congo River, downstream on the Pool Malebo and directly opposite the city of Brazzaville, capital of the Republic of the Congo. The Congo River is the second longest river in Africa after the Nile and has the continent's greatest discharge. As a waterway it provides a means of transport for much of the Congo Basin; it is navigable for river barges between Kinshasa and Kisangani; many of its tributaries are also navigable. The river is an important source of hydroelectric power, and downstream from Kinshasa it has the potential to generate power equivalent to the usage of roughly half of Africa's population.

The older and wealthier part of the city (ville basse) is located on a flat area of alluvial sand and clay near the river, while many newer areas are found on the eroding red soil of surrounding hills. Older parts of the city were laid out on a geometric pattern, with de facto racial segregation becoming de jure in 1929 as the European and African neighborhoods grew closer together. City plans of the 1920s–1950s featured a cordon sanitaire or buffer between the white and black neighborhoods, which included the central market as well as parks and gardens for Europeans.

Urban planning in post-independence Kinshasa has been limited. The Mission Française d'Urbanisme drew up some plans in the 1960s which envisioned a greater role for automobile transportation but did not predict the city's significant population growth. Thus much of the urban structure has developed without guidance from a master plan. According to UN-Habitat, the city is expanding by eight square kilometers per year. It describes many of the new neighborhoods as slums, built in unsafe conditions with inadequate infrastructure. Nevertheless, spontaneously developed areas have in many cases extended the grid street plan of the original city.

Administrative divisions
 
Kinshasa is both a city (ville in French) and a province, one of the 26 provinces of the Democratic Republic of the Congo. Nevertheless, it has city subdivisions and is divided into 24 communes (municipalities), which in turn are divided into 369 quarters and 21 embedded groupings. Maluku, the rural commune to the east of the urban area, accounts for 79% of the  total land area of the city-province, with a population of 200,000–300,000.  The communes are grouped into four districts which are not in themselves administrative divisions.

 Funa District
 Bandalungwa
 Bumbu
 Kalamu
 Kasa-Vubu
 Makala
 Ngiri-Ngiri
 Selembao

 Lukunga District
 Barumbu
 Gombe
 Kinshasa
 Kintambo
 Lingwala
 Mont Ngafula
 Ngaliema

 Mont Amba District
 Kisenso
 Lemba
 Limete
 Matete
 Ngaba

 Tshangu District
 Kimbanseke
 Maluku
 Masina
 Ndjili (N'Djili)
 Nsele (N'Sele)

Climate
Under the Köppen climate classification, Kinshasa has a tropical wet and dry climate (Aw). Its lengthy rainy season spans from October through May, with a relatively short dry season, between June and September. Kinshasa lies south of the equator, so its dry season begins around its winter solstice, which is in June. This is in contrast to African cities further north featuring this climate where the dry season typically begins around December. Kinshasa's dry season is slightly cooler than its wet season, though temperatures remain relatively constant throughout the year.

Demographics

An official census conducted in 1984 counted 2.6 million residents. Since then, all estimates are extrapolations. The estimates for 2005 fell in a range between 5.3 million and 7.3 million. In 2017, the most recent population estimate for the city, it has a population of 11,855,000.

According to UN-Habitat, 390,000 people immigrate to Kinshasa annually, fleeing warfare and seeking economic opportunity.

According to a projection (2016) the population of metropolitan Kinshasa will increase significantly, to 35 million by 2050, 58 million by 2075 and 83 million by 2100, making it one of the largest metropolitan areas in the world.

Language
The official language of the Democratic Republic of the Congo, of which Kinshasa is the capital, is French (See: Kinshasa French vocabulary). Kinshasa is the largest officially Francophone city in the world, albeit that the vast majority of people either cannot speak French, or struggle in speaking it.  although Lingala is widely used as a spoken language. French is the language of street signs, posters, newspapers, government documents, schools; it dominates plays, television, and the press, and it is used in vertical relationships among people of different social classes. People of the same class, however, speak the Congolese languages (Kikongo, Lingala, Tshiluba or Swahili) among themselves.

Government and politics 

The head of Kinshasa ville-province has the title of Gouverneur. Gentiny Ngobila Mbala has been governor since 2019. Each commune has its own Bourgmestre.

Although political power in the DRC is fragmented, Kinshasa as the national capital represents the official center of sovereignty, and thus of access to international organizations and financing, and of political powers such as the right to issue passports. Kinshasa is also the primate city of the DRC with a population several times larger than the next-largest city, Lubumbashi.

The United Nations Organization Stabilization Mission in the Democratic Republic of the Congo, known by its French acronym MONUSCO (formerly MONUC) has its headquarters in Kinshasa. In 2016, the UN placed more peacekeepers on active duty in Kinshasa in response to the unrest directed against Kabila, at that time. Critics, including recently the US ambassador to the UN, have accused the peacekeeping mission of supporting a corrupt government.

Other non-governmental organizations play significant roles in local governance.  The Belgian development agency (Coopération technique belge; CTB) since 2006 sponsors the Programme d’Appui aux Initiatives de Développement Communautaire (Paideco), a 6-million-euro program aimed at economic development. It began work in Kimbanseke, a hill commune with population verging on one million.

Economy

Big manufacturing companies such as Marsavco S.A., All Pack Industries and Angel Cosmetics are located in the centre of town (Gombe) in Kinshasa.

There are many other industries, such as Trust Merchant Bank, located in the heart of the city.  Food processing is a major industry, and construction and other service industries also play a significant role in the economy.

Although home to only 13% of the DRC's population, Kinshasa accounts for 85% of the Congolese economy as measured by gross domestic product. A 2004 investigation found 70% of inhabitants employed informally, 17% in the public sector, 9% in the formal private sector, and 3% other, of a total 976,000 workers. Most new jobs are classified as informal.

The People's Republic of China has been heavily involved in the Congo since the 1970s, when they financed the construction of the Palais du Peuple and backed the government against rebels in the Shaba war. In 2007–2008 China and Congo signed an agreement for an $8.5 billion loan for infrastructure development. Chinese entrepreneurs are gaining an increasing share of local marketplaces in Kinshasa, displacing in the process formerly successful Congolese, West African, Indian, and Lebanese merchants.

Mean household spending in 2005 was the equivalent of US$2,150, amounting to $1 per day per person. The median household spending was $1,555, 66 cents per person per day. Among the poor, more than half of this spending goes to food, especially bread and cereal.

Education

Kinshasa is home to several higher-level education institutes, covering a wide range of specialities, from civil engineering to nursing and journalism. The city is also home to three large universities and an arts school:
 Académie de Design (AD)
 Institut Supérieur d'Architecture et Urbanisme
 Université Panafricaine du Congo (UPC)
 University of Kinshasa
 Université Libre de Kinshasa
 
 Congo Protestant University
 Université Chretienne de Kinshasa
 National Pedagogy University
 National Institute of Arts
 Institut Supérieur de Publicité et Médias
 Centre for Health Training (CEFA)

Primary and secondary schools:
 Lycée Prince de Liège (primary and secondary education, French Community of Belgium curriculum)
 Prins van Luikschool Kinshasa (primary education, Flanders curriculum)
Lycée Français René Descartes (primary and secondary education, French curriculum)
 The American School of Kinshasa
 Allhadeff School

In 2005, 93% of children over six attended school and 70% of people over 15 were literate in French.

Health and medicine
There are twenty hospitals in Kinshasa, plus various medical centres and polyclinics.

Since 1991, Monkole Hospital is operating as a non-profit health institution collaborating with the Health Department as district hospital in Kinshasa. Directed by Pr Léon Tshilolo, paediatrician and haematologist, Monkole Hospital opened a 150-bed building in 2012 with improved clinical services as laboratory, diagnostic radiology, intensive care, neonatal unit, family medicine, emergencies unit and a larger surgical area.

Culture 
Located in Kinshasa are the National Museum and the Kinshasa Fine Arts Academy.

Kinshasa is the home to much of the Congo's intelligentsia, including a political class which developed during the Mobutu era.

Kinshasa has a flourishing music scene which, since the 1960s, has operated under the patronage of the city's elite. The Orchestre Symphonique Kimbanguiste, formed in 1994, began using improved musical instruments and has since grown in means and reputation.

A pop culture ideal type in Kinshasa is the mikiliste, a fashionable person with money who has traveled to Europe. Adrien Mombele, a.k.a. Stervos Niarcos, and musician Papa Wemba were early exemplars of the mikiliste style. La Sape, a linked cultural trend also described as dandyism, involves wearing flamboyant clothing.

Many Kinois have a negative view of the city, expressing nostalgia for the rural way of life, and a stronger association with the Congolese nation than with Kinshasa.

Places of worship 

Among the places of worship, which are predominantly Christian churches and temples: Roman Catholic Archdiocese of Kinshasa (Catholic Church), Kimbanguist Church, Baptist Community of Congo (Baptist World Alliance), Baptist Community of the Congo River (Baptist World Alliance), Assemblies of God, Province of the Anglican Church of the Congo (Anglican Communion), The Church of Jesus Christ of Latter-day Saints which has a temple and over 100 congregations in Kinshasa, Presbyterian Community in Congo (World Communion of Reformed Churches). There are also Muslim mosques. A Baha'i House of Worship is currently under construction.

Media

Kinshasa is home to several media outlets, including radio and television stations, including state-run Radio-Télévision nationale congolaise (RTNC) and privately run Digital Congo and Raga TV. The private channel RTGA is also based in Kinshasa.

Several national radio stations, including La Voix du Congo, which is operated by RTNC, MONUC-backed Radio Okapi and Raga FM are based in Kinshasa, as well as numerous local stations. The BBC is also available in Kinshasa on 92.6 FM.

The state-controlled Agence Congolaise de Presse news agency is based in Kinshasa, as well as several daily and weekly newspapers and news websites, including L'Avenir (daily), La Conscience, LeCongolais (online),L'Observateur (daily), Le Phare, Le Potentiel, and Le Soft.

Most of the media uses French and Lingala to a large extent; very few use the other national languages.

Sports 

Sports, especially football and martial arts are popular in Kinshasa. The city is home to the country's national stadium, the Stade des Martyrs (Stadium of the Martyrs). The Vita Club, Daring Club Motema Pembe and AS Dragons frequently draws large crowds, enthusiastic and sometimes rowdy, to the Stade des Martyrs. Dojos are popular and their owners influential.

In 1974, Kinshasa hosted The Rumble in the Jungle boxing match between Muhammad Ali and George Foreman, in which Ali defeated Foreman, to regain the World Heavyweight title.

Buildings and institutions

Kinshasa is home to the Government of the Democratic Republic of the Congo including: 
 the Palais de la Nation, home of the President, in Gombe;
 the Palais du Peuple, meeting place of both houses of Parliament, Senate and National Assembly, in Lingwala;
 the Palais de Justice, in Gombe;
 the Cité de l’OUA, built for the Organization of African Unity in the 1970s and now serving government functions, in Ngaliema.

The Central Bank of the Congo has its headquarters on Boulevard Colonel Tshatshi, across the street from the Mausoleum of Laurent Kabila and the presidential palace.

The quartier Matonge is known regionally for its nightlife.

Notable features of the city include the Gecamines Commercial Building (formerly SOZACOM) and Hotel Memling skyscrapers; L'ONATRA, the impressive building of the Ministry of Transport; the central market; the Limete Tower. The face of Kinshasa is changing as new buildings are being built on the Boulevard du 30 Juin: Crown Tower (on Batetela) and Congofutur Tower.

Infrastructure and housing 

The city's infrastructure for running water and electricity is generally in bad shape. The electrical network is in disrepair to the extent that prolonged and periodic blackouts are normal, and exposed lines sometimes electrify pools of rainwater.

Regideso, the national public company with primary responsibility for water supply in the Congo, serves Kinshasa only incompletely, and not with uniformly perfect quality. Other areas are served by decentralized Associations des Usagers des Réseau d’Eau Potable (ASUREPs). Gombe uses water at a high rate (306 liters per day per inhabitant) compared to other communes (from 71 L/d/i in Kintambo down to 2 L/d/i in Kimbanseke).

The city is estimated to produce 6,300 m3 of trash and 1,300 m3 of industrial waste per day.

The housing market has seen rising prices and rents since the 1980s. Houses and apartments in the central area are expensive, with houses selling for a million dollars and apartments going for $5000 per month. High prices have spread outward from the central area as owners and renters move out of the most expensive part of the city. Gated communities and shopping malls, built with foreign capital and technical expertise, began to appear in 2006. Urban renewal projects have led in some cases to violent conflict and displacement. The high prices leave incoming refugees with few options for settlement besides illegal shantytowns such as Pakadjuma.

In 2005, 55% of households had televisions and 43% had mobile phones. 11% had refrigerators and 5% had cars.

Transport

The city-province has 5000 km of roadways, 10% of which are paved. The Boulevard du 30 Juin (Boulevard of 30 June) links the main areas of the central district of the city. Other roads also converge on Gombe. The east–west road network linking the more distant neighborhoods is weak and thus transit through much of the city is difficult. The quality of roads has improved somewhat, developed in part with loans from China, since 2000.

The public bus company for Kinshasa, created in 2003, is Transco (Transport au Congo).

Several companies operate registered taxis and taxi-buses, identifiable by their yellow colour.

Air
The city has two airports: N'djili Airport (FIH) is the main airport with connections to other African countries as well as to Istanbul, Brussels, Paris and some other destinations. N'Dolo Airport, located close to the city centre, is used for domestic flights only with small turboprop aircraft. Several international airlines serve Ndjili Airport including Kenya Airways, South African Airways, Ethiopian Airlines, Brussels Airlines, Air France and Turkish Airlines. An average of ten international flights depart each day from N'djili Airport. A small number of airlines provide domestic service from Kinshasa, for example Congo Airways and flyCAA. Both offer scheduled flights from Kinshasa to a limited number of cities inside DR Congo.

Rail

 
The Matadi–Kinshasa Railway connects Kinshasa with Matadi, Congo's Atlantic port. The line reopened in September 2015 after around a decade without regular service. There is an intermittent service, with a poor safety record.

According to the Commercial Corporation of Transport and Ports (SCTP), the Matadi-Kinshasa Railway (CFMK) has the highest transport of goods in import, 8 746 tonnes in January, 11,318 tonnes in February 10,032 tonnes in March, 7,244 tonnes in April, 5,024 tonnes in March and 7,745 tonnes in June. The monthly tonnage of exported goods reached only 1,000 tonnes in the month of March 2018. In January some 284 tonnes of goods were exported from the ports of Boma and Matadi, via the railway, and 711 tonnes in February, then 1,058 tonnes in March, 684 tonnes in April, 818 tonnes in May and 853 tonnes in June.

The monthly statistics for passenger traffic are as follows: 2,294 persons in January, 1,836 in February, 2065 in March, 2,660 in April, 1,952 in May and 2,660 in June.

The line connecting the port of Matadi to Kinshasa is 366 km long. Its distance has been since 3111 of 3112 feet or 42 inches (lane capped 1,067 meter): This railway belongs, in fact, to the National Society, Congo Railways (SNCC). It is only exploited by the SCTP, formerly ONATRA, according to an agreement signed by the two companies.

This line lost large shares of the market, following its lamentable state, insecurity on the rails (some trains are attacked), and the rehabilitation of the road along the rails in 2000. According to Congolese sources, an agreement with a Chinese construction company was signed in 2006, according to which this Chinese company will finance the renovation of the track, the rolling stock, the communication channels for the signaling, and the electrical power source. The ex-ONATRA has, in fact, opted for an aggressive commercial policy to revive the rails.

On June 30, 2018, the SCTP received two locomotives and 50 wagons from the African firm ARSS (African-Rolling Stock Solution).

In 2017, some 2.2 million tonnes of cement were produced by the two new start-up companies, PPC Barnet and Kongo Cement Factory (CIMKO). The SCTP did indeed transport part of this production to Kinshasa but the exact quantity was not communicated by the railway department of the company, the former DG Kimbembe Mazunga had communicated an agreed protocol of agreements with the cement manufacturers of Kongo-Central for the transport of their productions.

External transport
Kinshasa is the major river port of the Congo. The port, called 'Le Beach Ngobila' extends for about  along the river, comprising scores of quays and jetties with hundreds of boats and barges tied up. River transport also connects to dozens of ports upstream, such as Kisangani and Bangui.

There are road and rail links to Matadi, the sea port in the Congo estuary  from the Atlantic Ocean.

There are no rail links from Kinshasa further inland, and road connections to much of the rest of the country are few and in poor condition.

Social issues

Crime and punishment
Since the Second Congo War, the city has been striving to recover from disorder, with many youth gangs hailing from Kinshasa's slums. The U.S. State Department in 2010 informed travelers that Kinshasa and other major Congolese cities are generally safe for daytime travel, but to beware of robbers, especially in traffic jams and in areas near hotels and stores.

Some sources say that Kinshasa is extremely dangerous, with one source giving a homicide rate of 112 per 100,000 people per year. Another source cites a homicide rate of 12.3 per 100,000. By some accounts, crime in Kinshasa is not so rampant, due to relatively good relations among residents and perhaps to the severity with which even petty crime is punished.

While the military and National Police operate their own jails in Kinshasa, the main detention facility under the jurisdiction of the local courts is the Kinshasa Penitentiary and Re-education center in Malaka. This prison houses more than double its nominal capacity of 1,000 inmates. The Congolese military intelligence organization, Détection Militaire des Activités Anti-Patrie (DEMIAP) operates the Ouagadougou prison in Kintambo commune with notorious cruelty.

By 2017 the population of Malaka prison was reported at 7,000–8,000. Of these, 3,600–4,600 escaped in a jailbreak in May 2017.

Street children
In the 2010s, street children or "Shegués", often orphaned, are subject to abuse by the police and military. Of the estimated 20,000 children living on Kinshasa's streets, almost a quarter are beggars, some are street vendors and about a third have some kind of employment. Some have fled from physically abusive families, notably step-parents, others were expelled from their families as they were believed to be witches, and have become outcasts. Previously a significant number were civil war orphans.

Street children are mainly boys, but the percentage of girls is increasing according to UNICEF.  Ndako ya Biso provides support for street children, including overnight accommodation for girls. There are also second generation street children: "they referred to their sub-culture of violence as kindoubill".

These children have been the object of considerable outside study.

Notable people

International relations 
Kinshasa is twinned with:

  Brazzaville, Republic of the Congo
  Johannesburg, South Africa
  Ubon Ratchathani, Thailand
  Ankara, Turkey, since 2005

In popular culture
 WWE wrestler Shinsuke Nakamura uses a running knee strike, called the Kinshasa, as his finisher. This is, obviously, a reference to the eponymous city. However, the move was previously named as Bomaye (which translated to "kill him") during his time in New Japan Pro Wrestling but was renamed in 2016 when he was signed with the WWE for trademark reasons.

See also
 Traffic robots in Kinshasa
 Lake Chad replenishment project

Films about Kinshasa 
 Kinshasa Kids
 Kinshasa palace
 Kinshasa Symphony

References

Bibliography 
 Nzuzi, Francis Lelo (2008). Kinshasa: Ville et Environnement. Paris: L'Harmattan, September 2008. .
 Pain, Marc (1984). Kinshasa: la ville et la cité. Paris: Orstom, Institut Français de Recherche Scientifique pour le Développement en Coopération.

External links

 
 Official website of the city of Kinshasa
 Map of the Belgian Congo from 1896 includes a map of Kinshasa
 Slideshow of 21 photos of Kinshasa from 2013 to 2015 on Open Society Foundations website
 Kinshasa: a travers le centre ville, May 2015 – footage from streets of Kinshasa

 
Capitals in Africa
Communities on the Congo River
Democratic Republic of the Congo–Republic of the Congo border crossings
Populated places established in 1881
1881 establishments in Africa